Mark Webster is a British journalist and broadcaster who has presented many of Channel 5's late night sports shows.

TV presenting

He hosted the "Off the Wall" show on the music channel, Music Box, before being given a job by ITV co-hosting arts and entertainment guide 01-for London in 1988. He appeared on the show for three series, also recording specials from Los Angeles, Moscow, Berlin and the Edinburgh Festival.
Other presenting credits include an entertainment strand for BBC News 24, reviewing music videos on The Little Picture Show and hosting First Take, a series for first-time film makers on Anglia.
He is also popular as a pundit; contributing to C4's Top Ten... and British Soul series and ITV's Tribes.
He also gave the voice-over for the top 40 Only Fools and Horses moments for the entertainment channel Dave.
He is a script writer and credits include Never Mind the Buzzcocks, and A League of Their Own.

Sport presenting
Webster's first role on a sports show came on the cable station Sportswire where he fronted live events and chat shows. In 1995, he began a three-year run of working in the United States for British station Channel 4 anchoring their live game coverage of NBA matches as well as presenting their basketball lifestyle magazine show 24/7.

He also co-narrated the multi-sport programme Gillette World Sports Special, alongside David Jensen.

For 10 years Webster worked on a variety of programmes for Channel 5 including hosting their NBA, NFL, NHL and IndyCar coverage, plus their multi-sport programme Live And Dangerous, usually alongside Kevin Day.
In August 2010 Webster started presenting his own football podcast 'The Whistleblowers', produced by Playback Media.

Radio

Webster hosted KISS FM's breakfast show for two years and the Xfm breakfast show for one, he has also worked for Jazz FM and TalkSPORT and for several years was TV pundit on Simon Mayo's BBC Radio 5 Live early afternoon show. He is now a regular contributor to Talksport 2 and one of the featured pundits on Radio 5 Live's Virtual Jukebox feature with Dotun Adebayo on Up All Night.

Print

Webster began his media career in the 1980s as assistant editor on the world's most popular black music magazine Blues & Soul. More recently, he has continued to freelance for publications such as The Face, Loaded and GQ, writing 'style' articles covering fashion, film, design and music. He now has his own TV review column, Edge of The Box, for Sport Mail Online and is staff writer for men's quarterly style magazine Jocks & Nerds.

References

English television journalists
British television newsreaders and news presenters
British radio journalists
English radio personalities
Living people
Year of birth missing (living people)
National Football League announcers
National Hockey League broadcasters
National Basketball Association broadcasters
Motorsport announcers